Chiragh Jalta Raha is a 1962 Pakistani Urdu film produced and directed by Fazal Ahmad Karim Fazli. The film introduced Zeba, Deeba, Muhammad Ali, Talat Hussain, and Kemal Irani. Miss Fatima Jinnah opened the film's premiere in March 1962. Chiragh Jalta Raha won a Nigar Award in the best script writer category.

Plot
The central theme of the movie revolves around how politicians abuse the system. Shakir is a principled and virtuous school headteacher in his town. A selfish and greedy politician of the same town, who is also a Nawab, wants to marry his Jamila (Zeba) to Shakir's son Jameel so that he could use Shakir's honor and good name for their political purposes. Jamila and Jamal's relationship is settled, but Nawab Sahib does not agree with Shakir's principledness. Shakir sends his son Jameel to Karachi and moves to another village with his daughter Saba and son Munna. He fakes himself as Ayaz. By becoming Ayaz, he finds out the pains and sufferings of the people. No one knows that it is Nawab Mahmood. Afsar Khan, the younger brother of the same Nawab, who is a lustful person by nature, one day casts his evil eye on Shakir's daughter Saba. Shakir's Begum is a greedy woman, who is under the spell of Afsar Khan. Shaker opposes the marriage of Saba and Afsar Khan. Afsar Khan's brother also forbids Begum from this marriage, but she does not agree and blocks his entry into her house. One day Afsar Khan plans to kidnap Saba through his colleague Luqman. 

After his daughter's kidnapping, Shakir comes to Karachi, to his son Jameel, where he meets the publisher of his book, Nabi Ahmed. Jameel is also present there. Afsar Khan also comes to his house as a guest of the same publisher. Seeing Jameela, he thinks of making her his wife, but when he finds out that she wants Jameel, Afsar Khan sends Jameel to Dhaka to get him a job, so that he can marry Jameela. Shakir heads back to his town, where he meets his daughter Saba at the station, who tells him that Afsar Khan has ruined his honor by pretending to marry. He goes to Afsar Khan and warns him to accept Saba as his wife, or else he will have to face the court. After hearing this, Afsar Khan jails Shakir with his relations. When Jameel comes to know the whole situation, he goes to the village to kill Afsar Khan, but he is arrested by the police. Father and son meet in prison. Jameel and Shakir are respected by all the prisoners because of their good character. One day Afsar Khan's colleague Luqman falls into the hands of the police, who during the investigation uncovers all the atrocities of Afsar Khan. Nawab Mahmood hands over his brother Afsar Khan to the police and all the others join together.

Jamil and Jamila get married. Shakir's book is also published from England, for which he gets 50 thousand as royalty. All the sufferings of Shakir are removed and the lamp of a new dawn is lit.

Cast
 Zeba — as Jameela
 Arif — as Jameel
 Deeba — as Saba
 Muhammad Ali — as Afsar Khan
 Talat Hussain — as Munna
 Waheed Mehmood — as Shakir
 Kemal Irani
 Naina
 Safia Moini
 Ameer Khan
 Mughal Basheer
 Roma
 Dady
 Prinsses Amina

Music
The film's music was composed by Nihal Abdulah. The lyrics were taken from the poetry of Mirza Ghalib, Mir Taqi Mir, Jigar Moradabadi, Mahir ul Qadri, Ameer Khusro, and Fazal Ahmad Karim Fazli. Among the playback singers were Iqbal Bano, Noor Jehan, Kajjan Begum,  M. Kaleem, and Shabana. The Indian playback singer Talat Mehmood also vocalized 3 songs for the film.

Release and box office
Chiragh Jalta Raha was released on 9 March 1962. It was premiered by Fatima Jinnah, who was the chief guest in the opening ceremony held at Nishat cinema, Karachi. The film received positive reviews from the critics and was crowned as a silver jubilee hit.

Historical significance for Pakistani cinema
Chiragh Jalta Raha  gave Pakistani cinema multiple stars who would dominate Lollywood for decades to follow. Chiragh Jalta Raha launched the careers of Zeba and Muhammad Ali who later not only became a popular screen couple but partners in real life as well. Deeba who had entered the film industry as a child artist, got a chance through Chiragh Jalta  Raha to play her first lady role. Though the film's hero Arif couldn't get benefited from the movie and disappeared right after. It was also the debut movie of actors Kemal Irani and Talat Hussain.

Awards

References

1962 films
1960s Urdu-language films
Nigar Award winners
Urdu-language Pakistani films